Margery Deane was the pen name  of Marie J. Davis Pitman (née Davis 1850–1888), an American author.

Biography
Marie was born in Hartwick, New York on March 17, 1850. She was the daughter of Lucius D. Davis, of Newport, Rhode Island, "Daily News", was educated by private tutors, and in 1866 married Theophilus T. Pitman. She died in Paris, France, on November 30, 1888.

Works
Under her pen-name was "Margery Deane", and Marie wrote children's stories and sketches of travel, and was the Newport correspondent of the Boston Transcript and other journals. She co-authored  Wonder-World stories: from the Chinese, French, German, Hebrew, Hindoostanee, Hungarian, Irish, Italian, Japanese, Russian, Swedish, and Turkish, published by G.P. Putnam's Sons, in 1877, and the author of a travel book, European Breezes published by Lee and Shepard in 1880.

Notes

References

1850 births
1888 deaths
American children's writers
American travel writers
American women travel writers
People from Hartwick, New York
American women children's writers
19th-century American women writers
19th-century American writers